Mahesh Bhupathi and Leander Paes were the defending champions, but lost in the first round this year.

Alex O'Brien and Jared Palmer won in the final 6–3, 6–4, against Piet Norval and Kevin Ullyett.

Seeds

  Mahesh Bhupathi /  Leander Paes (first round)
  Olivier Delaître /  Fabrice Santoro (semifinals, withdrew)
  Martin Damm /  Cyril Suk (quarterfinals)
  Yevgeny Kafelnikov /  Daniel Vacek (quarterfinals)

Draw

Draw

External links
Draw

1999 Qatar Open
1999 ATP Tour
Qatar Open (tennis)